Hipponix,  common name hoof snails or hoof shells, is a genus of small sea snails with limpet-like shells, marine gastropod molluscs in the family Hipponicidae, the hoof snails. Many (but not all) of the species in this genus have white shells.

Species
Species within the genus Hipponix include:
 Hipponix antiquatus (Linnaeus, 1767)
 Hipponix benthophila (Dall, 1889)
 Hipponix climax Simone, 2005
 Hipponix conicus (Schumacher, 1817)
 Hipponix conicus wyattae (Powell, 1958)
 Hipponix costellatus  Carpenter, 1856
 Hipponix cranioides Carpenter, 1864
 Hipponix delicatus Dall, 1908
 Hipponix floridanus Olsson & Harbison, 1953
 Hipponix grayanus Menke, 1853
 Hipponix imbricatus 
 Hipponix incurvus (Gmelin, 1791)
 Hipponix leptus Simone, 2002
 Hipponix mogul Chino, 2006
 Hipponix panamensis C.B. Adams, 1852
 Hipponix pilosus (Deshayes, 1832)
 Hipponix planatus Carpenter, 1857
 Hipponix subrufus (Lamarck, 1822)
 Hipponix ticaonicus Sowerby, 1846
 Hipponix tumens Carpenter, 1864 - ribbed hoofsnail

NOTE: According to notes in Rosenberg, 2009, the online database Malacolog 4.1.1, H. antiquatus was described without a type locality. This same species was previously considered to occur in both the Eastern Pacific and the Western Atlantic, but some records of this species from the Western Atlantic may in fact be H. leptus instead.

 Species brought into synonymy
 Hipponix acutus Quoy & Gaimard, 1835: synonym of  Hipponix conicus (Schumacher, 1817)
 Hipponix australis (Lamarck, 1819): synonym of Sabia australis (Lamarck, 1819)
 Hipponix barbatus Sowerby, 1835: synonym of Hipponix pilosus (Deshayes, 1832)
 Hipponix inexpectata Mestayer, 1929: synonym of Spirobranchus latiscapus (Marenzeller, 1885)
 Hipponix lissus (E.A. Smith, 1894): synonym of Malluvium lissum (E. A. Smith, 1894)

References

 Mestayer M.K. (1929) Notes on New Zealand Mollusca. 4. Transactions and Proceedings of the New Zealand Institute 60(1): 247–250, pls 20–25. [Published 31 May 1929] 
 Dell, R.K., 1956. The archibenthal Mollusca of New Zealand. Dominion Mus. Bull. Wellington 18: 1-235
 Vaught, K.C. (1989). A classification of the living Mollusca. American Malacologists: Melbourne, FL (USA). . XII, 195 pp.
 Gofas, S.; Le Renard, J.; Bouchet, P. (2001). Mollusca, in: Costello, M.J. et al. (Ed.) (2001). European register of marine species: a check-list of the marine species in Europe and a bibliography of guides to their identification. Collection Patrimoines Naturels, 50: pp. 180–213

Further reading 
 Powell A. W. B., New Zealand Mollusca, William Collins Publishers Ltd, Auckland, New Zealand 1979

External links 
 (1862). drawing of the anatomy

Hipponicidae
Gastropod genera